Cheonan Stadium is a multi-purpose stadium in Cheonan, South Korea. Built in 2001, it is currently used mostly for football matches and can accommodate 26,000 spectators. On 15 October 2013, the South Korea national football team used the stadium for the first time in the friendly match against Mali, which ended in a 3–1 victory for South Korea. The stadium also hosted nine matches at the 2017 FIFA U-20 World Cup.

References

External links
Official website 
World Stadiums 

Football venues in South Korea
Sport in South Chungcheong Province
Multi-purpose stadiums in South Korea
Athletics (track and field) venues in South Korea
Buildings and structures in Cheonan
Sports venues completed in 2001
K League 2 stadiums
2001 establishments in South Korea